Emil Stang (14 June 1834 – 4 July 1912) was a Norwegian jurist and politician. He served as the 5th prime minister of Norway from 1889–1891 and again from 1893–1895. He also served as the first leader of the Conservative Party from 1884–1889, 1891–1893 and 1896–1899.

Biography
Emil Stang  was born and died in Christiania (now Oslo, Norway). He was the son of former Prime Minister Frederik Stang. Stang became cand.jur. in 1858 and established his own legal practice in 1861. Starting that year he also took part in the editing of Ugeblad for Lovkyndighed ("Weekly magazine for Law knowledge"). From 1871 to 1907 he was the editor of Norsk Retstidende (the annals of Norwegian courts), except for the years when he was Prime Minister. 

He was the first chairman of the Conservative Party from 1884–1889, and lead the party again 1891–1893, and again 1896–1899. He was Prime Minister from 1889 to 1891 and from 1893 to 1895. From 1889 to 1891 he was President of the Storting. In 1891 he was appointed judge at Kristiania Stiftsoverrett, however, he never acceded this office. He became presiding judge (lagmann) for Borgarting and Agder regional courts in 1895 and Supreme Court Justice in 1901. He retired in 1904.

Personal life
In  1890, Stang was appointed as a Knight Grand Cross of the Order of St. Olav. He was the father of Emil Stang and Fredrik Stang. He  died in Christiania.

References

External links 
Family genealogy

1834 births
1912 deaths
Lawyers from Oslo
Presidents of the Storting
Members of the Storting
Prime Ministers of Norway
Politicians from Oslo
Supreme Court of Norway justices
19th-century Norwegian politicians
Emil
Children of national leaders
Leaders of the Conservative Party (Norway)
19th-century Norwegian lawyers
Norwegian legal writers
Norwegian magazine editors
Ministers of Education of Norway